The 31st Metro Manila Film Festival was held in Manila, Philippines from December 25, 2005 to January 7, 2006.

Zsa Zsa Padilla, Marvin Agustin and the movie, Blue Moon topped the 2005 Metro Manila Film Festival. The festival's Best Picture award went to Regal Films' Blue Moon, while the Best Actress and Best Actor awards were awarded to Padilla and Agustin for their roles in Mano Po 4: Ako Legal Wife and Kutob respectively. The Best Supporting Actor and Actress awards went to Jose Manalo for Enteng Kabisote 2: Okay Ka Fairy Ko: The Legend Continues and Cherry Pie Picache for Mano Po 4: Ako Legal Wife.

Entries
There are two batches of films in competition, the first batch was shown from December 25, while the second batch was shown on January 1, 2006.

Winners and nominees

Awards
Winners are listed first and highlighted in boldface.

Multiple awards

Ceremony Information

"Best Director" issue
Director Joel Lamangan walked out after he lost to Jose Javier Reyes. Lamangan failed to win the Best Director for Blue Moon against Reyes' Kutob. In the same year, Regal Films's matriarch Lily Monteverde voiced out her disappointment as she lamented that some winners in the festival were "undeserving."

Box Office gross

References

External links

Metro Manila Film Festival
MMFF
MMFF
MMFF
MMFF